Margam ( meaning: the path) is an Indian film co-written, directed and produced by Rajiv Vijay Raghavan under the banner of Image commune. The film is an adaptation of Pithrutharppanam, the famous story by M. Sukumaran. Margam won seven major Kerala State Film Awards from the government of Kerala and one National Film Award from the government of India in 2003. One of the rarest Malayalam films that received wider critical acclaim at international level, Margam was exhibited at 16 international film festivals and won six international awards in categories including best film and scripting. The script was co-written by Rajiv Vijay Raghavan, Anvar Ali and Dr. S P Ramesh. Cinematography was by Venu and the roles performed by Nedumudi Venu and Meera Krishna were also widely appreciated.

Plot
The film tells the story of a revolutionary who, years later, realises that his efforts have been wasted and witnesses the ill-fate of his co-rebels and leads a secluded life in a state of clinical depression.

Cast
 Nedumudi Venu as Venukumara Menon, the protagonist. A former militant communist revolutionary, now living a secluded life as a "parallel college" lecturer.
 Meera Krishna as Prakrithi, Menon's daughter
 Shobha Mohan as Elisabeth, Menon's wife
 K. P. A. C. Lalitha Menon's sister
Valsala Menon Menon's aunt
 Madambu Kunjukuttan
 V K Sreeraman
 Madhupal
 P. Sreekumar

Awards
 National Film Awards
 Indira Gandhi Award for Best Debut Film of a Director
 Special jury mention - Nedumudi Venu

 Kerala State Film Awards
 Kerala State Film Award for Best Film
 Kerala State Film Award for Best Screenplay - Rajiv Vijay Raghavan, Anvar Ali and S. P. Ramesh
 Kerala State Film Award for Best Actor - Nedumudi Venu
 Kerala State Film Award (Special Jury Award) - Meera Krishna
 Kerala State Film Award for Best Cinematography - Venu
 Kerala State Film Award for Best Background Music - Issac Thomas Kottukapally
 Kerala State Film Award for Best Sound Recordist - N. Harikumar

 Fajr Film Festival, Tehran, Iran
 Asian Competition - Best Script - Rajiv Vijay Raghavan, Anvar Ali and S. P. Ramesh

 Zanzibar International Film Festival, Zanzibar
 "Golden Dhow" - Best film

 The South Soth Film Encounter, Asilah , Morocco
 "Golden Waves" - Best Script Rajiv Vijay Raghavan, Anvar Ali and S. P. Ramesh

 Cine Pobre Film Festival, Cuba
 Special Jury Prize for the film
 Best Actor prize Nedumudi Venu

 International Film Festival of Kerala, India
 FIPRESCI Special Mention - Margam

References

External links
 
 Margam review by Variety

2000s Malayalam-language films
2003 directorial debut films
2003 films
Best Debut Feature Film of a Director National Film Award winners